Bent Nielsen is a professorial fellow in economics at Nuffield College, University of Oxford. Nielsen has research interests in econometrics and financial economics: time series, outlier detection, and cohort analysis. Nielsen completed his Ph.D. at the University of Copenhagen.

Selected publications
Books
Econometric Modeling: A Likelihood Approach. Princeton University Press, 2007. (with David F. Hendry)
Papers
Kuang, D., Nielsen, B. and Nielsen, J.P. "The geometric chain-ladder." Scandinavian Actuarial Journal vol. 2015, 278-300.
Nielsen, B. and Whitby, A. (2015) "A Joint Chow Test for Structural Instability." Econometrics 3, 156–186.
Martínez Miranda, M.D., Nielsen, B. and Nielsen, J.P. (2015) "Inference and forecasting in the age-period-cohort model with unknown exposure with an application to mesothelioma mortality." Journal of the Royal Statistical Society series A 178, 29-55.
Nielsen, B. and Nielsen, J.P. (2014) "Identification and forecasting in mortality models." The Scientific World Journal. vol. 2014, Article ID 347043, 24 pages. doi:10.1155/2014/347043

References 

Fellows of Nuffield College, Oxford
Danish economists
Living people
Year of birth missing (living people)
University of Copenhagen alumni